This is the list of the Weapons used in the Philippine revolution.

Background

The Philippine Revolution, also called the Tagalog War  by the Spanish, was a revolution and subsequent conflict fought between the Katipunan, later the Philippine Revolutionary Army, and the Spanish colonial government.

Orders and circulars were issued covering matters such as building trenches and fortifications, equipping every male aged 15 to 50 with bows and arrows (as well as bolo knives and Gulok though officers wielded European swords), enticing Filipino soldiers in the Spanish army to defect, collecting empty cartridges for refilling, prohibiting unplanned sorties, inventories of captured arms and ammunition, fundraising, purchasing of arms and supplies abroad, unification of military commands, and exhorting the rich to give aid to the soldiers.

List of Equipment

Spanish Colonial Government
 These are the weapons used by the Guardia Civil , and the Spanish Army:

Handguns

 Revolver
 Mauser C96
 Mauser Zig-Zag

Rifles

 Spanish M93 - Standard rifle  - Primarily used by Guardia Civil.
 Remington Rolling Block rifle Used by Guardia Civil.

Melee weapons
 Sabers - used by officers in the battle field
 Bayonets

Machine guns
 Nordenfelt Guns

Artillery
 Krupp gun
 Ordóñez guns - Spanish coast guard

Filipino Revolutionaries
 These are the weapons that used by the early and late Katipunan , and the Philippine Revolutionary Army from infantry, Tiradores , cavalry, artillery, sappers: and even Muslim Filipinos.

Handguns
 Revolver
 Mauser C96

Rifles
 Mauser Model 1893 - Standard rifle for Republican Army
 Remington Rolling Block rifle - Rifle issued to Tiradores (Sharpshooters)
 Muskets - Used in the prelude battles.

Melee weapons

.
 Bolo knife - standard melee of the Katipunero militias also known as Tagalog iták, Cebuano as  súndang, Ilocano as bunéng and Hiligaynon as binangon.
 Kalis - used by Moro people in Mindanao.
 Sibat 
 Balisong
 Gulok - used as a primary Sabre for enlisted officers.
 Barung Knives 
 Spike bayonet
 Dahong palay
 Parang - Used primarily in Visayas and Mindanao.

Machine Guns
 Nordenfelt Guns Captured from the Spanish

Artillery

 Krupp gun
 Ordóñez guns
 Lantaka's - used by the local villagers and specially in Mindanao.

Other information

 The Bolo knife was the primary weapon used by the Katipunan during the Philippine Revolution. It was also used by the Filipino guerrillas and bolomen during the Philippine–American War. the bolo serves as a symbol for the Katipunan and the Philippine Revolution, particularly the Cry of Pugad Lawin. Several monuments of Andres Bonifacio, as with other notable Katipuneros, depict him holding a bolo in one hand and the Katipunan flag in the other.
 The Filipino forces sometimes  used improvised artillery weapons made of water pipes reinforced with bamboo or timber, which can only fire once or twice.
 During the 1896 uprising against Spanish colonial rule the 1898 Philippine Revolution and the Spanish–American War, Filipino freedom-fighters (especially the Katipunan) sought  assistance from the Japanese government. The Katipunan sent a delegate to the Emperor of Japan to solicit funds and military arms in May 1896. Although the Meiji government of Japan was unwilling and unable to provide any official support, Japanese supporters of Philippine independence in the Pan-Asian movement raised funds and sent weapons on the privately charted Nunobiki Maru unfortunately, the ship sank before it reach to Philippine shores.

See also
 Philippine Revolutionary Army
 Katipunan
 Philippine Revolution
 Guardia Civil
 Warfare in pre-colonial Philippines
 Military History of the Philippines
 List of weapons of the Spanish–American War

References

External links
 Philippines Independence Armies: Insignia 1896 - 1902
 * 

Naval artillery
Philippine–American War
Indigenous culture of the Tagalog people
Weapons of the Philippines
Philippine Revolution
Military history of the Philippines
Disbanded armies
Philippine revolution